Gmund, Gmünd or Gmuend (cf. , "(river) mouth") may refer to the following places:

 Schwäbisch Gmünd, a town in Baden-Württemberg, Germany
 Gmund am Tegernsee, a municipality in Bavaria, Germany
 Gmünd, Carinthia, Austria
 Gmünd, Lower Austria, Austria, capital city of
 Gmünd District, Lower Austria, Austria

See also 

 Gemünd
 Gmunden
 Gemünden (disambiguation)